Cluster II is a space mission of the European Space Agency, with NASA participation, to study the Earth's magnetosphere over the course of nearly two solar cycles. The mission is composed of four identical spacecraft flying in a tetrahedral formation. As a replacement for the original Cluster spacecraft which were lost in a launch failure in 1996, the four Cluster II spacecraft were successfully launched in pairs in July and August 2000 onboard two Soyuz-Fregat rockets from Baikonur, Kazakhstan. In February 2011, Cluster II celebrated 10 years of successful scientific operations in space. , its mission has been extended until the end of 2022. China National Space Administration/ESA Double Star mission operated alongside Cluster II from 2004 to 2007.

Mission overview 
The four identical Cluster II satellites study the impact of the Sun's activity on the Earth's space environment by flying in formation around Earth. For the first time in space history, this mission is able to collect three-dimensional information on how the solar wind interacts with the magnetosphere and affects near-Earth space and its atmosphere, including aurorae.

The spacecraft are cylindrical (2.9 x 1.3 m, see online 3D model) and are spinning at 15 rotations per minute. After launch, their solar cells provided 224 watts power for instruments and communications. Solar array power has gradually declined as the mission progressed, due to damage by energetic charged particles, but this was planned for and the power level remains sufficient for science operations.  The four spacecraft maneuver into various tetrahedral formations to study the magnetospheric structure and boundaries. The inter-spacecraft distances can be altered and has varied from around 4 to 10,000 km.  The propellant for the transfer to the operational orbit, and the maneuvers to vary inter-spacecraft separation distances made up approximately half of the spacecraft's launch weight.

The highly elliptical orbits of the spacecraft initially reached a perigee of around 4 RE (Earth radii, where 1 RE = 6371 km) and an apogee of 19.6 RE.  Each orbit took approximately 57 hours to complete. The orbit has evolved over time; the line of apsides has rotated southwards so that the distance at which the orbit crossed the magnetotail current sheet progressively reduced, and a wide range of dayside magnetopause crossing latitudes were sampled. Gravitational effects impose a long term cycle of change in the perigee (and apogee) distance, which saw the perigees reduce to a few 100 km in 2011 before beginning to rise again. The orbit plane has rotated away from 90 degrees inclination. Orbit modifications by ESOC have altered the orbital period to 54 hours. All these changes have allowed Cluster to visit a much wider set of important magnetospheric regions than was possible for the initial 2-year mission, improving the scientific breadth of the mission.

The European Space Operations Centre (ESOC) acquires telemetry and distributes to the online data centers the science data from the spacecraft. The Joint Science Operations Centre JSOC at Rutherford Appleton Laboratory in the UK coordinates scientific planning and in collaboration with the instrument teams provides merged instrument commanding requests to ESOC.

The Cluster Science Archive is the ESA long term archive of the Cluster and Double Star science missions. Since 1 November 2014, it is the sole public access point to the Cluster mission scientific data and supporting datasets. The Double Star data are publicly available via this archive. The Cluster Science Archive is located alongside all the other ESA science archives at the European Space Astronomy Center, located near Madrid, Spain. From February 2006 to October 2014, the Cluster data could be accessed via the Cluster Active Archive.

History
The Cluster mission was proposed to ESA in 1982 and approved in 1986, along with the Solar and Heliospheric Observatory (SOHO), and together these two missions constituted the Solar Terrestrial Physics "cornerstone" of ESA's Horizon 2000 missions programme.  Though the original Cluster spacecraft were completed in 1995, the explosion of the Ariane 5 rocket carrying the satellites in 1996 delayed the mission by four years while new instruments and spacecraft were built.

On July 16, 2000, a Soyuz-Fregat rocket from the Baikonur Cosmodrome launched two of the replacement Cluster II spacecraft, (Salsa and Samba) into a parking orbit from where they maneuvered under their own power into a 19,000 by 119,000 kilometer orbit with a period of 57 hours. Three weeks later on August 9, 2000, another Soyuz-Fregat rocket lifted the remaining two spacecraft (Rumba and Tango) into similar orbits.  Spacecraft 1, Rumba, is also known as the Phoenix spacecraft, since it is largely built from spare parts left over after the failure of the original mission.  After commissioning of the payload, the first scientific measurements were made on February 1, 2001.

The European Space Agency ran a competition to name the satellites across all of the ESA member states. Ray Cotton, from the United Kingdom, won the competition with the names Rumba, Tango, Salsa and Samba. Ray's town of residence, Bristol, was awarded with scale models of the satellites in recognition of the winning entry, as well as the city's connection with the satellites. However, after many years of being stored away, they were finally given a home at the Rutherford Appleton Laboratory.

Originally planned to last until the end of 2003, the mission has been extended several times. The first extension took the mission from 2004 until 2005, and the second from 2005 to June 2009. The mission has now been extended until the end of 2020.

Scientific objectives
Previous single and two-spacecraft missions were not capable of providing the data required to accurately study the boundaries of the magnetosphere.  Because the plasma comprising the magnetosphere cannot be viewed using remote sensing techniques, satellites must be used to measure it in-situ.  Four spacecraft allow scientists make the 3D, time-resolved measurements needed to create a realistic picture of the complex plasma interactions occurring between regions of the magnetosphere and between the magnetosphere and the solar wind.

Each satellite carries a scientific payload of 11 instruments designed to study the small-scale plasma structures in space and time in the key plasma regions: solar wind, bow shock, magnetopause, polar cusps, magnetotail, plasmapause boundary layer and over the polar caps and the auroral zones.

 The bow shock is the region in space between the Earth and the sun where the solar wind decelerates from super- to sub-sonic before being deflected around the Earth.  In traversing this region, the spacecraft make measurements which help characterize processes occurring at the bow shock, such as the origin of hot flow anomalies and the transmission of electromagnetic waves through the bow shock and the magnetosheath from the solar wind.
 Behind the bow shock is the thin plasma layer separating the Earth and solar wind magnetic fields known as the magnetopause.  This boundary moves continuously due to the constant variation in solar wind pressure.  Since the plasma and magnetic pressures within the solar wind and the magnetosphere, respectively, should be in equilibrium, the magnetosphere should be an impenetrable boundary.  However, plasma has been observed crossing the magnetopause into the magnetosphere from the solar wind.  Cluster's four-point measurements make it possible to track the motion of the magnetopause as well as elucidate the mechanism for plasma penetration from the solar wind.
 In two regions, one in the northern hemisphere and the other in the south, the magnetic field of the Earth is perpendicular rather than tangential to the magnetopause.  These polar cusps allow solar wind particles, consisting of ions and electrons, to flow into the magnetosphere.  Cluster records the particle distributions, which allow the turbulent regions at the exterior cusps to be characterized.
 The regions of the Earth's magnetic field that are stretched by the solar wind away from the Sun are known collectively as the magnetotail.  Two lobes that reach past the Moon in length form the outer magnetotail while the central plasma sheet forms the inner magnetotail, which is highly active.  Cluster monitors particles from the ionosphere and the solar wind as they pass through the magnetotail lobes.  In the central plasma sheet, Cluster determines the origins of ion beams and disruptions to the magnetic field-aligned currents caused by substorms.
 The precipitation of charged particles in the atmosphere creates a ring of light emission around the magnetic pole known as the auroral zone.  Cluster measures the time variations of transient particle flows and electric and magnetic fields in the region.

Instrumentation on each Cluster satellite

Double Star mission with China

In 2003 and 2004, the China National Space Administration launched the Double Star satellites, TC-1 and TC-2, that worked together with Cluster to make coordinated measurements mostly within the magnetosphere. TC-1 stopped operating on 14 October 2007. The last data from TC-2 was received in 2008. TC-2 made a contribution to magnetar science as well as to magnetospheric physics. The TC-1 examined density holes near the Earth's bow shock that can play a role in bow shock formation and looked at neutral sheet oscillations.

Awards  
Cluster team awards

2019	Royal Astronomical Society Group Achievement Award 
2015	ESA 15th anniversary award
2013	ESA team award
2010	International Academy of Astronautics Laurels for team achievements for Cluster and Double Star teams
2005	ESA Cluster 5th anniversary award
2004	NASA group achievement award
2000	Popular science best of what's new award
2000	ESA Cluster launch award

Individual awards

2023   Hermann Opgenoorth (Univ. of Umea, Sweden), former Cluster Ground Based Working Group lead, was awarded the 2023 EGU Julius Bartels Medal 
2020   Daniel Graham (Swedish Institute of Space Physics, Uppsala, Sweden) was awarded the COSPAR Zeldovich medal 
2019	Margaret Kivelson (UCLA, USA), Cluster FGM CoI, received RAS gold medal
2018   Hermann Opgenoorth (Univ. of Umea, Sweden), former Cluster Ground Based Working Group lead, was awarded the 2018 Baron Marcel Nicolet Space Weather and Space Climate medal  
2016	Stephen Fuselier (SWRI, USA), Cluster CIS CoI, received EGU Hannes Alfvén Meda
2016   Mike Hapgood, Cluster mission scientific operations expert was awarded the Baron Marcel Nicolet Medal for Space Weather and Space Climate 
2014	Rumi Nakamura (IWF, Austria), Cluster CIS/EDI/FGM CoI, received EGU Julius Bartels Medal 
2013	Mike Hapgood (RAL, UK), Cluster JSOC project scientist received RAS service award
2013	Göran Marklund, EFW Co-I, received the EGU Hannes Alfvén Medal 2013.
2013	Steve Milan, Cluster Ground based representative of the Cluster mission received UK Royal Astronomical Society (RAS) Chapman medal
2012	Andrew Fazakerley, Cluster and Double Star PI (PEACE), received the Royal Astronomical Society Chapman Medal
2012	Zuyin Pu (Pekin U., China), RAPID/CIS/FGM CoI, received AGU International Award 
2012	Jolene Pickett (Iowa U., USA), a Cluster WBD PI, received the State of Iowa Board of Regents Staff Excellence 
2012	Jonathan Eastwood (Imperial College, UK), FGM Co-I, received COSPAR Yakov B. Zeldovich medal 
2008	Andre Balogh (Imperial College, UK), Cluster FGM PI, received RAS Chapman medal
2006	Steve Schwartz (QMW, UK), Cluster UK data system scientist and PEACE co-I, received RAS Chapman medal

Discoveries and mission milestones

2022 
 October 14 - New insights on the formation of transpolar auroral arc 
 September 20 - A highway for atmospheric ion escape from Earth during the impact of an interplanetary coronal mass ejection 
 August 03 - Joint Cluster/ground-based studies in the first 20 years of the Cluster mission 
 July 18 – In situ observation of a magnetopause indentation that is correspondent to throat aurora and is caused by magnetopause reconnection
 June 16 - Kelvin-Helmholtz vortices as an interplay of Magnetosphere-Ionosphere coupling 
 June 02 - ESA highlight: Magnetic vortices explain mysterious auroral beads 
 May 16 -  The influence of localized dynamics on dusk-dawn convection in the Earth’s magnetotail 
 April 1 -  Dawn-dusk ion flow asymmetry in the plasma sheet 
 February 1 - South Pole Station ground-based and Cluster satellite measurements of leaked and escaping Auroral Kilometric Radiation 
 January 1 - Massive multi-mission statistical study and analytical modeling of the Earth's magnetopause

2021 
 December 15 - ESA highlight: Swarm and Cluster get to the bottom of geomagnetic storms 
 November 7 - Unique MMS and Cluster observations about magnetic reconnection extent at the magnetopause 
 November 2 - Spatial distribution of energetic protons in the magnetosphere based on 17 years of data 
 October 11 - Unique MMS and Cluster observation of disturbances in the near-Earth magnetotail before a magnetic substorm 
 September 7 - AGU EOS spotlight: Understanding Aurora Formation with ESA’s Cluster Mission 
 May 2 - Cluster and MMS uncover anisotropic spatial correlation functions at kinetic range in the magnetosheath turbulence 
 April 9 - The Solar-cycle Variations of the Anisotropy of Taylor Scale and Correlation Scale in the Solar Wind Turbulence 
 February 18 - Heavy Metal and Rock in Space: Cluster RAPID Observations of Fe and Si

2020 
 December 1 - Cluster, Helios and Ulysses reveal characteristics of solar wind supra thermal halo electrons
 November 1 - Cluster, Swam and CHAMP join forces to explain hemispheric asymmetries in the Earth magnetotail

 October 21 - Space plasma regimes classified with Cluster data
 October 1 - Effects of Solar Activity on Taylor Scale and Correlation Scale in Solar Wind Magnetic Fluctuations 
 September 1 -  Van Allen Probes and Cluster join forces to study Outer Radiation Belt Electrons

 August 9 - Cluster’s 20 years of studying Earth’s magnetosphere, celebrating 20 years after the launch of the second pair of Cluster spacecraft
 July 31 - ESA science highlight: Auroral substorms triggered by short circuiting of plasma flows
 July 16 - BBC skyatnight podcast with Dr. Mike Hapgood on 20 years of ESA’s Cluster mission, celebrating 20 years after the launch of the first pair of Cluster satellites
 April 20 - What drives some of the largest and most dynamic auroral forms?
 March 19 - ESA science highlight: Iron is everywhere in Earth's vicinity, suggest two decades of Cluster data
 February 27 - What makes Kelvin Helmholtz vortices grow at the Earth's magnetopause?

2019 
 December 23 - Magnetized dust clouds penetrate the terrestrial bow shock
 November 18 - ESA science highlight: Earth’s magnetic song recorded for the first time during a solar storm
October 10 - What is the source of the energetic oxygen ions found in the high-altitude cusp region? 
August 27 - ESA science highlight: Cluster and XMM pave the way for SMILE
August 20 - Asymmetric transport of the Earth's polar outflows by the interplanetary magnetic field
August 5 - Energetic electron acceleration found by Cluster in unconfined reconnection jets for the first time
May 1 - Kelvin‐Helmholtz waves magnetic curvature and vorticity: Four‐spacecraft Cluster observations
March 4 - ESA science highlight: Cluster helps solve mysteries of geomagnetic storms
February 27 - ESA science highlight: Cluster reveals inner workings of Earth's cosmic particle accelerator
February 13 - Statistical survey of the terrestrial bow shock observed by the Cluster spacecraft
January 14 - Super-efficient electron acceleration by an isolated magnetic reconnection

2018 
November 28 – Complete picture of the O+ circulation (and escape) in the outer magnetosphere and its dependence on geomagnetic activity

November 8 - ESA science highlight: Windy with a chance of magnetic storms – space weather science with Cluster
September 30 - O+ escape during the extreme space weather event of 4–10 September 2017
August 8 - Statistical survey of day-side magnetospheric current flow using Cluster observations: bow shock
June 20 – Detection of magnetic nulls around reconnection fronts (open access)
May 21 – Tailward propagation of magnetic energy density variations with respect to substorm onset times (open access)
April 24 – Kelvin–Helmholtz Instability: lessons learned and ways forward
March 29 – Three-dimensional density and compressible magnetic structure in solar wind turbulence
February 8 – ESA spotlight on... Understanding Earth: what the Cluster mission has taught us so far
January 29 – ESA research highlight: Cluster measures turbulence in Earth's magnetic environment
January 22 – Science nugget of the 2013-2014 Cluster Inner Magnetosphere campaign

2017 
December 11, 2017 – Empirical modeling of the quiet and storm time geosynchronous magnetic field

December 6, 2017 – Direct measurement of anisotropic and asymmetric wave vector spectrum in ion-scale solar wind turbulence

October 30, 2017 – Coherent structures at ion scales in the fast solar wind: Cluster observations

September 18, 2017 – An intense magnetic substorm scrutinized by a fleet of satellites including Cluster and MMS (open access)

August 28, 2017 – Relationship between electron field‐aligned anisotropy and dawn‐dusk magnetic field: nine years of Cluster observations in the Earth magnetotail

August 1, 2017 – Collisionless shock velocity estimation at Venus and Earth (open access)

June 16, 2017 – Cover of GRL: Global ULF waves generated by a hot flow anomaly
April 10, 2017 - ESA research highlight: O marks the spot for magnetic reconnection
April 7, 2017 – EOS research spotlight: Explaining unexpected twists in the Sun's Magnetic Field

March 23, 2017 – Occurrence frequency and location of magnetic islands at the dayside magnetopause

February 18, 2017 – Magnetic reconnection and their associated auroral enhancements (open access)

2016 
October 3, 2016 – What happens to the Earth's magnetosphere when its bow shock disappears?

September 6, 2016 – Embry-Riddle University (FL, USA) science highlight: Space plasma hurricanes could lead to new sources of energy

July 20, 2016 – Cluster and MMS join forces to understand the origin of northern lights

July 8 – Transport of solar wind H+ and He++ ions across Earth's bow shock

July 7 – ESA science highlight: the curious case of Earth's leaking atmosphere

June 11 – Substructures within a dipolarization front revealed by high-temporal resolution Cluster observations

May 11 – Cone angle control of the interaction of magnetic clouds with the Earth's bow shock

March 21 – The particle carriers of field‐aligned currents in the Earth's magnetotail during a substorm

February 29 – The role of ionospheric O+ outflow in the generation of earthward propagating plasmoids
January 11 – A statistical study of plasmaspheric plumes and ionospheric outflows observed at the dayside magnetopause

2015 
December 7 - Coalescence of magnetic flux ropes in the ion diffusion region of magnetic reconnection 
October 22 - Wide-banded Non-Thermal Continuum (NTC) radiation: local to remote observations by the four Cluster satellites 
September 3 - Statistics and accuracy of magnetic null identification in multispacecraft data (open access) 
August 22 - Cusp dynamics under northward IMF using three‐dimensional global particle‐in‐cell simulations (open access) 
July 14 - Cluster solves the mystery of equatorial noise 
July 1 - Seven ESA satellites team up to explore the Earth's magnetic field 
April 9 - Heart of the black auroras revealed by Cluster 
March 25 - Cluster satellite catches up
February 19 - Magnetospheric signatures of ionospheric density cavities observed by Cluster (open access)
February 16 - Solar illumination control of ionospheric outflow above polar cap arcs (open access) 
January 16 – Rejigging the Cluster quartet at the bow shock and in the solar wind

2014 
December 18 – Origin of high-latitude auroras revealed
November 20 - The Cluster mission is extended by ESA up to 2018
September 4 - Full particle electromagnetic simulations of entropy generation across a collisionless shock
August 28 – A mixed-up magnetic storm
July 1 - Dawn–dusk asymmetries in the coupled solar wind–magnetosphere–ionosphere system: a review
June 15 - Solar wind breaks through the Earth's magnetic field

May 28 - Evidence of strong energetic ion acceleration in the near‐Earth magnetotail (free access)

May 7 - Cluster helps to model Earth's mysterious magnetosphere

March 15 - Direct calculation of the ring current distribution and magnetic structure seen by Cluster during geomagnetic storms (open access)

January 13 - Low-altitude electron acceleration due to multiple flow bursts in the magnetotail (open access)

2013 
November 26 - Cluster takes a tilt at radio wave sources  
November 15 – On the relation between asymmetries in the ring current and magnetopause current (free access)

September 20 - ESA's Cluster satellites in closest-ever 'dance in space'
September 10 – Cluster shows plasmasphere interacting with Van Allen belts  
July 18 - Wobbly magnetic reconnection speeds up electrons
July 2 - Cluster discovers steady leak in the Earth's plasmasphere
May 2 - Cluster hears the heartbeat of magnetic reconnection
April 15 - From solar activity to stunning aurora (ESA Space Science's image of the week)
April 10 – Cluster finds source of aurora energy boost

2012 
December 18 – The solar wind is swirly
October 24 - Cluster observes a 'porous' magnetopause

August 1 – Cluster looks into waves in the magnetosphere's thin boundaries
July 2 - Hidden Portals in Earth's Magnetic Field (NASA science cast video)
June 6 – Origin of particle acceleration in cusps of Earth's magnetosphere uncovered
March 7 - Earth’s magnetic field provides vital protection
February 27 - Northern lights mystery may be solved (Space.com)
February 23 - Surprise Ions (Science News for kids) 
January 26 - Giant veil of cold plasma discovered high above Earth (National Geographic)
January 24 – Elusive matter found to be abundant far above Earth (AGU press release)

2011 
November 16 – Cluster reveals Earth's bow shock is remarkably thin
September 6 – Ultra fast substorm auroras explained
August 31 - 40 year old Mariner 5 solar wind problem finds answer
July 5–10 - Aurora explorer: the Cluster mission exhibit at the Royal Society summer science exhibition 2011
July 4 – Cluster observes jet braking and plasma heating
June 30 - 'Dirty hack' restores Cluster mission from near loss
March   21 - How vital is a planet's magnetic field? New debate rises
February 5 – Cluster encounters a natural particle accelerator
January  7 - ESA spacecraft model magnetic boundaries

2010 
November 22 - ESA extends the Cluster mission until December 2014
October 4 – Cluster helps disentangle turbulence in the solar wind
September 1 - 10 years of success for Cluster quartet
 July 26 - Cluster makes crucial step in understanding space weather
 July 16 - Cluster's decade of discovery
 July 8 - Announcement of opportunity for Cluster guest investigators
 June 3 – The Cluster archive: more than 1000 users
 April 24 - High-speed plasma jets: origin uncovered
 March 11 - Shocking recipe for 'killer electrons'
 January 20 - Multiple rifts in Earth's magnetic shield

2009 
October 7 - ESA extends the Cluster mission until December 2012
July 16 – Cluster shows how solar wind is heated at electron scales
June 18 - Cluster and Double Star: 1000 publications
April 29 - Monitoring the impact of extreme solar events
March 25 - Cluster's insight into space turbulence
 February 9 - ESA extends the Cluster mission until the end of 2009
 January 14 – Cluster detects invisible escaping ions

2008 
December 15 - The science of space weather
 December 5 - Looking at Jupiter to understand Earth
 October 17 - Highlights from Cluster-THEMIS workshop
 August 27 - Cluster examines Earth-escaping ions
 August 11 - Electron trapping within reconnection
 June 27 - Beamed radio emission from Earth
June 9 - Reconnection - Triggered by Whistlers?
March 7 - Solitons found in the magnetopause
January 23 - Cluster result impacts future space missions

2007 
December 6 - Cluster explains nightside ion beams
November 21 - Cluster captures the impact of a Coronal Mass Ejection
November 9 - Cluster probes generalized Ohm's law in space 
October 22 - Cluster monitors convection cells over the polar caps
September 11 - Cluster and Double Star pinpoint the source of bright aurorae
July 26 - Cluster helps reveal how the Sun shakes the Earth's magnetic field
June 29 - Cluster unveils a new 3D vision of magnetic reconnection
June 21 - Formation flying at closest-ever separation
May 11 - Cluster reveals the reformation of the Earth's bow shock
April 12 - Cluster finds new clues on what triggers space tsunamis
March 26 - First direct evidence in space of magnetic reconnection in turbulent plasma
March 12 - A leap forward in probing magnetic reconnection in space
February 9 - New insights in the auroral electrical circuit revealed by Cluster

2006 
December 29 - 1000th Orbit for the Cluster Mission
December 6 - Cluster finds magnetic reconnection within giant swirls of plasma
November 13 - Cluster takes a new look at the plasmasphere
October 5 - Double Star and Cluster witness pulsated reconnection for several hours
August 24 - Cluster links magnetic substorms and Earthward directed high-speed flows
July 18 - Magnetic heart of a 3D reconnection event revealed by Cluster
June 20 - Space is fizzy
May 19 - New Microscopic Properties of Magnetic Reconnection Derived by Cluster
March 30 - Cluster and Double Star reveal the extent of neutral sheet oscillations
February 24 - Cluster reveals fundamental 3-D properties of magnetic turbulence
February 1 - The Cluster Active Archive goes live
January 11 - Cover of Nature Magazine: Feel the Force

2005 
December 22 - Cluster helps to protect astronauts and satellites against killer electrons
 September 21 - Double Star and Cluster observe first evidence of crustal cracking
August 10 - From ‘macro’ to ‘micro’ – turbulence seen by Cluster
July 28 - First direct measurements of the ring current
July 14 - Five years of formation flying with Cluster
April 28 - Calming effect of a solar storm
February 18 - Cluster will become the first multi-scale mission
February 4 - Direct observation of 3D magnetic reconnection

2004 
December 12 - Cluster determines the spatial scale of high speed flows in the magnetotail
November 24 Four-point observations of solar wind discontinuities
September 17 - Cluster locates the source of non-thermal terrestrial continuum radiation by triangulation
August 12 - Cluster finds giant gas vortices at the edge of Earth's magnetic bubble
June 23 - Cluster discovers internal origin of the plasma sheet oscillations
May 13 - Cluster captures a triple cusp
April 5 - First attempt to estimate Earth's bow shock thickness

2001–2003 
3 December 2003 - Cracks in Earth's magnetic shield (NASA website)
29 June 2003 - Multi-point observations of magnetic reconnection
20 May 2003 - ESA's Cluster solves auroral puzzle
29 January 2003 - Bifurcation of the tail current
28 January 2003 - Electric current measured in space for the first time
29 December 2002 - Thickness of the tail current sheet estimated in space for the first time
1 October 2002 - Telescopic/Microscopic view of a substorm
11 December 2001 - Cluster quartet probes the secrets of the black aurora
31 October 2001 - First measurements of density gradients in space
9 October 2001 - Double cusp observed by Cluster
1 February 2001 – Official start of scientific operations

References

Selected publications
All 3618 publications related to the Cluster and the Double Star missions (count as of 31 December 2022) can be found on the publication section of the ESA Cluster mission website. Among these publications, 3125 are refereed publications, 342 proceedings, 121 PhDs and 30 other types of theses.

External links
ESA Cluster mission website
The Cluster Science Archive, the public data archive of the Cluster and the Double Star missions
More on spacecraft operations
ESA Cluster mission Twitter account
Imperial College London role in the Cluster mission
University College London's Mullard Space Science Laboratory's role in the Cluster mission 
Cluster: aurora explorer, an exhibit at the Royal Society Summer Exhibition 2011
The Cluster Active Archive (former public data archive, up to 2014)
Cluster mission article on eoPortal by ESA

European Space Agency space probes
2000 in spaceflight
Geospace monitoring satellites
Geomagnetic satellites